Tunjiška Mlaka is a dispersed settlement next to Tunjice in the Tunjice Hills west of the town of Kamnik in Upper Carniola region of Slovenia.

References

External links
Tunjiška Mlaka on Geopedia

Populated places in the Municipality of Kamnik